The 2011 Türk Telecom İzmir Cup was a professional tennis tournament played on hard courts. It was the fourth edition of the tournament which was part of the 2011 ATP Challenger Tour. It took place in İzmir, Turkey between 19 and 25 September 2011.

ATP entrants

Seeds

 1 Rankings are as of September 12, 2011.

Other entrants
The following players received wildcards into the singles main draw:
  Haluk Akkoyun
  Durukan Durmus
  Muhammet Haylaz
  Efe Yurtacan

The following players received entry from the qualifying draw:
  Ervand Gasparyan
  James McGee
  Mohamed Safwat
  Simon Stadler

The following players received entry as a lucky loser into the singles main draw:
  Dimitar Kutrovsky

Champions

Singles

 Lukáš Lacko def.  Marsel İlhan, 6–4, 6–3

Doubles

 Travis Rettenmaier /  Simon Stadler def.  Flavio Cipolla /  Thomas Fabbiano, 6–0, 6–2

External links
Official Website
ITF Search
ATP official site